David Camps (born 22 May 1990) is a footballer who plays for ES Fosséenne.

The right winger played in the season 2010/2011 23 games on loan for US Luzenac.

References

External links 
 

1990 births
Living people
French footballers
Association football midfielders
Ligue 1 players
AJ Auxerre players